Elier Hernández (born November 21, 1994) is a Dominican professional baseball outfielder in the Texas Rangers organization. He made his MLB debut in 2022 for the Rangers.

Career

Kansas City Royals
Hernández signed with the Kansas City Royals as an international free agent on July 20, 2011. He made his professional debut appearing in 60 games with the rookie-level Idaho Falls Chukars in 2012. He returned to the Chukars in 2013, slashing .301/.350/.439 with 3 home runs and 44 RBI in 66 games. In 2014, Hernández spent the season with the Single-A Lexington Legends, appearing in 111 games and hitting .264/.296/.393 with 9 home runs and 24 RBI.

In 2015, Hernández split the season between Lexington and the High-A Wilmington Blue Rocks, posting a cumulative .268/.312/.379 slash with 6 home runs, 54 RBI, and 10 stolen bases in 124 contests. He played in 134 games for Wilmington the following year, batting .226/.281/.310 with 2 home runs and 43 RBI. For the 2017 season, he played in 46 games split between Wilmington and the Double-A Northwest Arkansas Naturals, hitting .317/.355/.489 with 5 home runs and 37 RBI between the two affiliates.

In 2018, Hernández played in 131 games split between Northwest Arkansas and the Triple-A Omaha Storm Chasers, hitting a cumulative .285/.330/.374 with 3 home runs, 65 RBI, and 10 stolen bases. The following season, he spent the year with Omaha, playing in 112 games and hitting .245/.296/.364 with 10 home runs, and 36 RBI and 8 stolen bases. He elected free agency following the season on November 4, 2019. Hernández did not sign with a team and did not play in a game in 2020 due to the cancellation of the minor league season because of the COVID-19 pandemic.

Texas Rangers
On December 28, 2020, Hernández signed a minor league contract with the Texas Rangers organization. He spent the 2021 season with the Double-A Frisco RoughRiders and the Triple-A Round Rock Express, posting a cumulative .231/.292/.394 slash with career-highs in home runs (16) and RBI (62) across 108 games. He was assigned to Round Rock to begin the 2022 season.

Hernández was selected to the 40-man roster and promoted to the majors for the first time on July 14, 2022. He appeared in 14 games for the big league club, going 6-for-33 with 3 RBI. On August 16, 2022, Hernández was designated for assignment by the Rangers. He cleared waivers and was sent outright to Round Rock on August 22. He elected free agency following the season on November 10, 2022.

See also
 List of Major League Baseball players from the Dominican Republic

References

External links

1994 births
Living people
People from San Cristóbal, Dominican Republic
Dominican Republic expatriate baseball players in the United States
Major League Baseball players from the Dominican Republic
Major League Baseball outfielders
Texas Rangers players
Idaho Falls Chukars players
Lexington Legends players
Gigantes del Cibao players
Wilmington Blue Rocks players
Northwest Arkansas Naturals players
Surprise Saguaros players
Omaha Storm Chasers players
Frisco RoughRiders players
Round Rock Express players
Dominican Republic expatriate baseball players in Colombia